Three referendums were held in Switzerland in 1963. The first was held on 26 May on a popular initiative on giving voters the right to decide on whether the Swiss Armed Forces should have nuclear weapons, and was rejected by voters. The second and third were held on 8 December on a federal resolution on continuing with the government's financial plans and on an amendment to the constitution on scholarships and educational allowances, both of which were approved by voters.

Results

May: People's initiative on nuclear weapons

December: Constitutional amendment on scholarships on educational allowances

December: Federal resolution on finance

References

1963 referendums
1963 in Switzerland
Referendums in Switzerland